Pars: Operation Cherry is a 2007 Turkish action film written, produced and directed by Osman Sınav. The film, which focuses on the lucrative but seedy underworld of drug trafficking, tells the story of a narcotics cop nicknamed "Pars" whose single aim is to revenge the death of his narcotics cop father who died 15 years ago while working on a case.

Production
Production began in October 2006 and the film was shot on location in Istanbul, Amsterdam and Monaco. An 89-strong crew along with 73 actors and around 1,000 extras took part in the production.

Synopsis
In a very dangerous police operation famous undercover Narcotic agent Ertugrul faces with a puzzling situation. Unfortunately he is killed along with his wife in front of their children before he solves the secret in the dark labyrinths of the world of drugs. Sixteen years later, his older son Attila, who has grown up to be a Narcotic officer with the nickname "Panther", will seek his revenge. In a narcotic operation, Attila along with his partner Asena, who is a female narcotic officer, they seize a huge amount of drugs that belongs to infamous drug kingpin Hashasi who is disguised himself as a respectable industrialist Vahdet Bozcan. Vahdet who has strong ties with politicians, pressures the authorities to post Attila to another job. Attila being demoted and striped from all his privileges desperately tries to find his way out. On top of everything, Atilla loses his only brother Tayfun to a drug-related crime and gets into depression. With the support of Asena and his colleagues Atilla puts himself together and unofficially starts pursuing Hashasi known as Vahdet Bozcan. In this long run, Attila pursues Vahdet from Turkey to Holland from France to Greece and from Monaco to mysterious streets of Istanbul and the drug infested schools of Istanbul. This time Attila is determined to find the killers of both his father and his brother while fighting against the drug network that starts from the top officials of the country and ends up in schools. With the help of Inci, a guidance teacher in the school of his late brother Tayfun, and Asena, Attila finds his way out but only to be lost in a love triangle between these two women. But he has a mission to complete. Attilla is ready to sacrifice everything even his life to the fight against drugs.

References

External links
  for the film
 

2000s crime action films
2007 films
2000s Turkish-language films
Films set in Turkey
Turkish crime action films
Films directed by Osman Sınav
Turkish films about revenge
Films about drugs